Shahab Khodro (Persian: شهاب خودرو) is an Iranian company which manufactures autobuses.  Founded in 1962, it is one of the oldest and best-known Iranian motor companies. 

The company began producing double-decker buses in 1972. In 1987 Shahab Khodro company teamed up with TAM, a former Yugoslavian company, in manufacturing buses.  The company later entered into technical co-operation with Renault Group of France, who purchased a 35% stake in the company.  In 2003 they began producing CNG buses.  The company produces 1000 buses per year and 500 assorted service vehicles. The company produces other vehicle-related products and functions such as frames, body shop, painting shop, chassis assembly line, trimming hall, machining press, and welding shops.

References

External links
Official site

Bus manufacturers of Iran
Vehicle manufacturing companies established in 1962
Iranian companies established in 1962